Nihility is the second studio album by Polish death metal band Decapitated. It was released on 19 February 2002 through Earache Records.

The German edition was issued in a green casing and contains a cover of the Napalm Death song "Suffer the Children".

Critical reception

After its release, Nihility received mostly positive reviews from music critics. Jason D. Taylor of AllMusic said "The vocals sound less homo sapien and more like demonic hellspawn, which intertwines with the exquisite death metal opera being performed by the rest of the band. The drumming here is relentless, pounding its way into the skull with furious determination." While Chris Bruni of Brave Words noted that the album "Musically it's tighter, the playing a bit more technical, yet not as technical as fellow country-deathsters Yattering, but still calculated, with a constant brutal flow. And it is the overall production - a tight clean openly heavy sound - that gives Nihility that "classic feel," a sound which is a cool mix of the classic Florida vibe bled with the classic Stockholm sound." Greg Pratt of Exclaim! praised the songwriting and Witold "Vitek" Kiełtyka skills: "The riffs show a nice element of groove within the grindcore madness, and the drumming is absolutely stunning; the double-bass work alone is worth the cost of the disc."

Track listing

Personnel

Decapitated
 Wojciech "Sauron" Wąsowicz – vocals
 Wacław "Vogg" Kiełtyka – guitars
 Marcin "Martin" Rygiel – bass
 Witold "Vitek" Kiełtyka – drums

Production
Wojtek and Sławek Wiesławscy – production, mixing, mastering, recording
 Jacek Wiśniewski – cover art

References 

Decapitated (band) albums
Earache Records albums
2002 albums